Fisher's Ghost is a 1960 Australian operetta. It is based on the legend of Fisher's ghost which had previously inspired the 1924 film from Raymond Longford.

Operetta
The operetta was composed by John Gordon and was originally performed at Sydney Teachers' College on 29 September 1960. It was revised for television.

Douglas Stewart wrote a play based on the same story which premiered shortly after the operetta.

Cast of 1960 Production
Ereach Riley
Alan Light as George Worral
Ross Whatson
Pamela Coleman as Mrs Hurley
Wilhelmina Bermingham as Miss Hurley

1963 TV Adaptation

The operetta was broadcast on the ABC. It was the first television opera with an Australian historical background.

Cast
Ereach Riley as Birdlime the pickpocket
Edmund Bohan as John Hurley
Marilyn Richardson as John Hurley's sister
Donald Philps as Fred Fisher

Reception
The Sydney Morning Herald thought the production had "musical merit" but had "serious" dramatic problems and needed to be revised.

See also
List of television plays broadcast on Australian Broadcasting Corporation (1960s)

References

External links
Operetta details at AustLit
TV adaptation at AustLit

1960s Australian television plays
1963 television plays
Australian Broadcasting Corporation original programming
English-language television shows
Australian live television shows
Black-and-white Australian television shows